The men's individual competition at the 2010 Asian Games in Guangzhou was held from 17 November to 20 November at the Dragon Lake Golf Club.

Schedule
All times are China Standard Time (UTC+08:00)

Results 
Legend
DNS — Did not start
DSQ — Disqualified

References 

Official Website 
Results

Golf at the 2010 Asian Games